Taylor High School is a six-year Roman Catholic comprehensive secondary school in New Stevenston, Motherwell, Scotland.
It is named after Monsignor Thomas Nimmo Taylor who was Parish Priest at St. Francis Xavier Church, Carfin for almost 50 years and who was responsible for the development of the Carfin Lourdes Grotto in 1922.

Staff

The Head Teacher is Mr. Paul McWatt, who is assisted by three Depute Head Teachers: Mr. Gerry McQuaid (S1 & S6), Mr John McGloughlin (S2 & S3) and Mrs. Ursula Johnston (S4 & S5). Taylor High School has a teaching staff complement of approximately 62 FTE (Full Time Equivalent). There are 9  Principal Teachers (Curriculum) and 6 Principal Teachers (Pupil Support). The Pupil Support department operates a horizontal system of pastoral care. Mr. McWatt became only the third substantive Head Teacher of the school since it opened in 1982 when he took up post in February 2021.

Catchment 

Pupils attend the school from New Stevenston (NS), Carfin, Holytown, Newarthill, Cleland and the Jerviston area of Motherwell. Taylor High School has associated primary schools of Christ the King in Holytown, Our Lady & St Francis in Carfin, St Mary's in Cleland, St Patrick's in New Stevenston and St Teresa's in Newarthill.

Uniform
The school uniform consists of: a wine coloured blazer (should be braided with gold S4-S6); grey or black skirt/trousers; a Taylor High School tie, which is Wine, Gold and Silver (S1-S3), the senior phase tie (S4-S6) is wine and includes a badge image on it.

HMIe Inspection
The school's most recent HMIe inspection report for Taylor High School was published in March 2011.   The outcome of the inspection was very good in many areas, such as: the structure of the schools curriculum, the quality of learning and teaching, support for pupils, pupils' impressive achievements in a wide range of activities, ethos, headteacher and senior management leadership and pupil contribution to the school community.  The use of technology within the school was also highlighted as a strength.

Notable former pupils

 John Kennedy - Assistant Manager, Celtic FC
 Barry Morrison - Professional boxer
 Christopher Kane - Fashion designer
 Ian McShane (footballer) - Professional Footballer

References

External links
 North Lanarkshire Council 

Catholic secondary schools in North Lanarkshire
Motherwell
Educational institutions established in 1982
1982 establishments in Scotland